The Boss Men is an album by organist Don Patterson with saxophonist Sonny Stitt and drummer Billy James recorded in late 1965 and released on the Prestige label.

Reception

Allmusic awarded the album 2½ stars stating "While this is a respectable straight-ahead jazz-with-organ session, it's also so similar to so many other Prestige dates from the mid-'60s -- not to mention the other dates which featured the exact same three players as this LP does -- that it challenges the reviewer to come up with anything new, fresh, and exciting to say about the music".

Track listing 
All compositions by Don Patterson except where noted.
 "Diane" (Art Pepper) – 5:40  
 "Someday My Prince Will Come" (Frank Churchill, Larry Morey) – 8:15  
 "Easy to Love" (Cole Porter) – 5:40  
 "What's New?" (Bob Haggart, Johnny Burke) – 5:30  
 "Big C's Rock" – 3:09 
 "They Say That Falling in Love Is Wonderful" (Irving Berlin) – 7:45

Personnel 
Don Patterson – organ
Sonny Stitt – alto saxophone
Billy James – drums

References 

Don Patterson (organist) albums
Sonny Stitt albums
1966 albums
Prestige Records albums
Albums produced by Cal Lampley
Albums recorded at Van Gelder Studio